Judith Jarvis Thomson (October 4, 1929November 20, 2020) was an American philosopher who studied and worked on ethics and metaphysics. Her work ranges across a variety of fields, but she is most known for her work regarding the thought experiment titled the trolley problem and her writings on abortion. She is credited with naming, developing, and initiating the extensive literature on the trolley problem first posed by Philippa Foot which has found a wide range use since. Thomson also published a paper titled "A Defense of Abortion", which makes the argument that the procedure is morally permissible even if it is assumed that a fetus is a person with a right to life. She was elected a member of the American Philosophical Society in 2019.

Early life and education
Thomson was born in New York City, on October 4, 1929. Her mother Helen (Vostrey) Jarvis was an English teacher and her father Theodore Jarvis was an accountant. Thomson's mother died when she was six and Theodore Jarvis remarried two years later. His second wife was Jewish and had two children.

Thomson’s parents placed no religious pressure on her, but she officially converted to Judaism at age fourteen, when she was confirmed at Temple Israel in Manhattan.

Thomson graduated from Hunter College High School in January 1946. She received her bachelor's degree (BA) from Barnard College in 1950, a second BA at Newnham College, Cambridge in 1952, an MA from Cambridge in 1956, and a PhD from Columbia University in 1959. All of her degrees were in philosophy.

In 1960, Thomson began teaching at Barnard College. In 1962, she married James Thomson, who was a visiting professor at Columbia University. Judith and James spent the 1962–1963 academic year at Oxford, after which they moved to Boston. Judith taught for a year at Boston University and, in 1964, was appointed to the faculty at the Massachusetts Institute of Technology (MIT) where she was Laurence S. Rockefeller Professor of Philosophy. James was also appointed a professor of philosophy at MIT. The Thomsons divorced in 1980; they remained colleagues until James's death in 1984.

Career
Thomson was a visiting professor at the University of Pittsburgh (1976), UC Berkeley School of Law (1983), and Yale Law School (1982, 1984, 1985). She has held fellowships from the Fulbright Foundation (1950–1951), the American Association of University Women (1962–1963), the National Endowment for the Humanities (1978–1979, 1986–1987), the Guggenheim Foundation (1986–1987), and the Center for Advanced Study in Oslo, Norway (1996). In 1989, Thomson was elected to the American Academy of Arts and Sciences, and in 1992–1993 she served as president of the American Philosophical Association (APA), Eastern Division. In 1999, she gave the Tanner Lectures on Human Values at Princeton University; her lecture was titled "Goodness and Advice". Thomson taught at MIT for the majority of her career, remaining there as professor emerita.

In 2012, Thomson was awarded the Quinn Prize by the American Philosophical Association.

In 2015, she was awarded an honorary doctorate by the University of Cambridge, and in 2016 she was awarded an honorary doctorate by Harvard University. In 2016, she was elected a Corresponding Fellow of the British Academy.

Thomson died on November 20, 2020, at the age of 91.  She was buried beside her former husband in Mount Auburn Cemetery.

Philosophical views
Thomson's main areas of research were moral philosophy and metaphysics. In moral philosophy she made significant contributions to meta-ethics, normative ethics, and applied ethics.

"A Defense of Abortion" (1971) introduced one thought experiment for which Thomson is especially well known. Published in 1971, Thomson’s work on abortion is historically connected to and located just prior to the court case of Roe v Wade. The paper asks the reader to imagine that her circulatory system has, without her consent, been connected to that of a famous violinist whose life she must sustain for nine months. The hypothetical posed by Thomson notably redirects philosophical attention from the rights of the fetus to those of the pregnant woman. Specifically, her argument accepts that a fetus is a person, moving past any discussion which revolved around that topic. Instead, Thomson claims that the bodily autonomy of the woman supersedes any rights of the fetus. This argument has been widely discussed since, such that it is accepted in some anti-abortion circles to have changed the way in which abortion is debated.

In regards to ethical theories, Thomson was opposed to consequentialist, hedonist, and subjectivist perspectives. Her work relied on specific elements of deontological argumentation.

In metaphysics, Thomson focused on questions regarding the relationship between actions and events, and between time and physical parts.

She also made significant contributions on the topic of privacy.

Selected publications

See also
Fact and Value: Essays on Ethics and Metaphysics for Judith Jarvis Thomson
 American philosophy
 The fat man version of the trolley problem
 Violinist (thought experiment)
 List of American philosophers

References

External links
 Judith Thomson at MIT

1929 births
2020 deaths
20th-century American philosophers
21st-century American philosophers
Alumni of Newnham College, Cambridge
American women philosophers
Barnard College alumni
Columbia Graduate School of Arts and Sciences alumni
Corresponding Fellows of the British Academy
Hunter College High School alumni
MIT School of Humanities, Arts, and Social Sciences faculty
Members of the American Philosophical Society
Metaphysicians
Writers from New York City
20th-century American women
21st-century American women
Burials at Mount Auburn Cemetery